Cyclodecene is a cycloalkene with a ten-membered ring, with two possible geometric isomers, denoted cis-cyclodecene and trans-cyclodecene, or (Z)-cyclodecene and (E)-cyclodecene.

References

Cycloalkenes
Ten-membered rings